Héctor Fabrizzio Vega Guerra (born 2 July 1992) is a Peruvian-Chilean former professional footballer who mainly played  for clubs in Chile and Peru as a forward.

Career
Mainly a centre forward, Vega was born in Lima, Peru to Chilean parents. Then, he moved to Iquique, Chile, along with his family and joined the Deportes Iquique youth ranks, having a brief step with US Lecce in Italy.

A product of Deportes Iquique youth system, he took part of the first team in 2010. After no having played in the Primera B de Chile, in 2011 he moved to Peru and joined Cobresol in the Peruvian Primera División. In his country of birth, he also played for Sport Boys, Walter Ormeño, Sport Loreto, Pacífico and Unión Tarapoto. In Chile, he also played for Trasandino, Unión San Felipe and Deportes Valdivia.

In other countries, he played for Kitsap Pumas in the USL League Two, Argentino de Rosario in the Argentine Primera D, Husqvarna FF in the Swedish Division 2 and Juventus Managua in the Liga Primera.

In the context of COVID-19 pandemic, he left Juventus Managua in March 2020. Then he returned to Chile and joined San Antonio Unido for the 2020 season of the Segunda División Profesional.

Personal life
Vega holds dual Peruvian-Chilean nationality since his parents are Chilean and he was born in Lima, Peru, when his father, the former professional footballer of the same name Héctor Luis Vega, played for Deportivo Yurimaguas. From both his father and his grandfather, he inherited his nickname Caldillo (Fish Soup).

In the context of COVID-19 pandemic, he and his father started a football academy named "Imperio H" in Iquique, making links with clubs in both Chile and Mexico.

Honours
Deportes Iquique
 Primera B de Chile: 2010

Sport Loreto
 Copa Perú: 2014

References

External links
 
 
 Héctor Vega at PlaymakerStats

1992 births
Living people
Footballers from Lima
Peruvian people of Chilean descent
Peruvian footballers
Citizens of Chile through descent
Chilean footballers
Peruvian expatriate footballers
Chilean expatriate footballers
Association football forwards
Deportes Iquique footballers
Cobresol FBC footballers
Sport Boys footballers
Walter Ormeño de Cañete players
Sport Loreto players
Kitsap Pumas players
Argentino de Rosario footballers
Trasandino footballers
Unión San Felipe footballers
Deportes Valdivia footballers
Husqvarna FF players
Juventus Managua players
San Antonio Unido footballers
Primera B de Chile players
Peruvian Primera División players
Peruvian Segunda División players
USL League Two players
Primera D Metropolitana players
Segunda División Profesional de Chile players
Division 2 (Swedish football) players
Nicaraguan Primera División players
Peruvian expatriate sportspeople in Italy
Peruvian expatriate sportspeople in the United States
Peruvian expatriate sportspeople in Argentina
Peruvian expatriate sportspeople in Sweden
Chilean expatriate sportspeople in Italy
Chilean expatriate sportspeople in the United States
Chilean expatriate sportspeople in Argentina
Chilean expatriate sportspeople in Sweden
Chilean expatriate sportspeople in Nicaragua
Expatriate footballers in Italy
Expatriate soccer players in the United States
Expatriate footballers in Argentina
Expatriate footballers in Sweden
Expatriate footballers in Nicaragua